Contra viento y marea may refer to:
 Contra viento y marea (Mexican TV series), a 2005 Mexican telenovela
 Contra viento y marea (Venezuelan TV series), a 1997 Venezuelan telenovela